The 2015 Copa Libertadores second stage was played from February 17 to April 22, 2015. A total of 32 teams competed in the second stage to decide the 16 places in the final stages of the 2015 Copa Libertadores.

Draw
The draw of the tournament was held on December 2, 2014, 21:00 UTC−3, at the CONMEBOL Convention Centre in Luque, Paraguay.

For the second stage, the 32 teams were drawn into eight groups of four containing one team from each of the four seeding pots. The seeding of each team was determined by their association and qualifying berth (as per the rotational agreement established by CONMEBOL, the teams which qualified through berths 1 from Colombia, Ecuador, Peru and Venezuela were seeded into Pot 1 for odd-numbered years, while the teams which qualified through berths 1 from Bolivia, Chile, Paraguay and Uruguay were seeded into Pot 1 for even-numbered years). Teams from the same association in Pots 1 and 2 could not be drawn into the same group. However, a first stage winner, whose identity was not known at the time of the draw, could be drawn into the same group with another team from the same association.

The six winners of the first stage which joined the 26 direct entrants were as follows:
Winner G1:  Huracán
Winner G2:  Estudiantes
Winner G3:  Deportivo Táchira
Winner G4:  The Strongest
Winner G5:  Palestino
Winner G6:  Corinthians

Format
In the second stage, each group was played on a home-and-away round-robin basis. The winners and runners-up of each group advanced to the round of 16.

Tiebreakers
The teams were ranked according to points (3 points for a win, 1 point for a draw, 0 points for a loss). If tied on points, tiebreakers were applied in the following order:
Goal difference in all games;
Goals scored in all games;
Goals scored in all away games;
Drawing of lots.

Groups
The matches were played on February 17–19, 24–26, March 3–5, 10–12, 17–19, April 1, 7–9, 14–16, and 21–22, 2015.

Group 1

Group 2

Group 3

Group 4

Group 5

Group 6

Group 7

Group 8

References

External links
 
Copa Libertadores 2015, CONMEBOL.com 

2